AKW may refer to:

 Aghajari Airport (IATA code akw), an airport serving Omidiyeh, Iran
 AKW, Indian Railways station code for Akona, Uttar Pradesh
 Akwa language (ISO 639-3 code akw), a Bantu language of the Republic of Congo
 Angkor Airways (ICAO code AKW), a defunct Cambodian airline
 Artesia: Adventures in the Known World, role-playing game
 Klawock Airport (FAA LID code AKW), airport in Klawock, Alaska
 General Family Allowances Act, Algemene Kinderbijslagwet, part of the Dutch Social security system